The Kennel Union of Southern Africa (formerly the South African Kennel Club and the South African Kennel Union) is the official kennel club of South Africa.

The club was founded as the South African Kennel Club in 1891 when the Southern African Kennel Club of Port Elizabeth formed an affiliation with the South African Kennel Club of Cape Town. The first documented dog show in South Africa took place in 1883 at the Albany Agricultural Show; the Port Elizabeth club was founded a week later, and the Cape Town club was founded in 1889. The Transvaal kennel club joined in 1894 and at a meeting in 1895 the kennel clubs of Cradock, East London and Grahamstown joined, Natal joined in 1899 and the Free State in 1905.

In 1920 the club reorganised and changed its name to the South African Kennel Union, with the affiliation of the kennel clubs of Rhodesia and South West Africa in 1964 the club adopted its present name, the Kennel Union of Southern Africa. Initially the club maintained very close links with The Kennel Club of the United Kingdom, adopting their breed standards and conformation judging formats, although for dog breeds not recognised by that club they used the standards of the Fédération Cynologique Internationale. In 1993 the club became a full member of the Fédération Cynologique Internationale.

References

External links
 Official website

1883 establishments in the Cape Colony
Dog breeding
Kennel clubs
Organizations established in 1883
Fédération Cynologique Internationale